Philippe Alcibiade Marie-Joseph Latombe (born 21 April 1975) is a French politician of the Democratic Movement (MoDem) who has represented the 1st constituency of the Vendée department in the National Assembly since 2017.

Biography 
Latombe is a union delegate for the French Confederation of Management – General Confederation of Executives.

Political career 
During the 1995 presidential election he campaigned for Jacques Chirac.

In parliament, Latombe has since been serving on the Committee on Legal Affairs. Since 2022, he has also been co-chairing a fact-finding mission on video surveillance in public spaces. 

In addition to his committee assignments, Latombe chairs the French-Mongolian Parliamentary Friendship Group and is part of the French-British Parliamentary Friendship Group, the French-Canadian Parliamentary Friendship Group, French-Israeli Parliamentary Friendship Group and the French-Russian Parliamentary Friendship Group.

References

Living people
Deputies of the 15th National Assembly of the French Fifth Republic
Democratic Movement (France) politicians
1975 births
Deputies of the 16th National Assembly of the French Fifth Republic
Members of Parliament for Vendée